Mohammad Ebadul Karim Bulbul (born 27 December 1956) is a Bangladesh Awami League politician and the incumbent Member of Parliament from Brahmanbaria-5. He is a Managing Director of Beacon Pharmaceuticals.

Early life 
Bulbul was born on 27 December 1956. He was born in Barail, Nabinagar Upazila, Brahmanbaria District. He studied up to a H.S.C degree.

Career 
Bulbul was elected to parliament from Brahmanbaria-5 as a candidate of Awami League on 30 December 2018. He served as an advisor to Bangladesh Krishak League.

Bulbul is the Managing Director of Beacon Pharmaceuticals. He contacted COVID-19 in May 2020 during the COVID-19 pandemic in Bangladesh.

On 26 April 2021, journalist Gauranga Debnath Apu was threatened by a mob outside his home who threatened to cut off his limbs. They said that no one would be allowed to reside in Brahmanbaria if they wrote against Bulbul.

 l

References

Awami League politicians
Living people
11th Jatiya Sangsad members
1955 births